İyirmi Altı Bakı Komissarı (also 26 Bakı komissarı, 26 Baky Komissary) was town in the Neftchala Rayon of Azerbaijan until 1993.

Settlement was united with urban-type settlement Həsənabad according to the resolution No. 611 of the Azerbaijan National Assembly on May 19, 1993 and was removed from the list of settlement of the district.

References 

Populated places in Neftchala District